The Río Frío ("Cold river") is a river on the Bogotá savanna and a right tributary of the Bogotá River.

Description 

The river flows north and westward before flowing south through Tabio.

In the valley of the Río Frío, shales belonging to the Guaduas Formation are outcropping. Also the Cacho, Bogotá and Chorrera Formations are present in the Río Frío valley. During the Last Glacial Maximum in the Late Pleistocene, the Río Frío deposited conglomerates and sands.

The basin of the Río Frío covers Zipaquirá, Pacho, Subachoque, Tabio, Cogua, Cota, Cajicá and Chía. The cultivation of flowers produces contamination of the Río Frío. The river overflows frequently. Carbon mining is present in the Río Frío basin.

See also 

 List of rivers of Colombia
 Altiplano Cundiboyacense
 Bogotá savanna
 Fucha River, Juan Amarillo River, Torca River, Tunjuelo River

References

Bibliography

External links 
  Sistema Hídrico, Bogotá

Rivers of Colombia
Bogotá River
Geography of Cundinamarca Department
Zipaquirá
Rivers